This is a list of Romanian Air Force air bases/airfields, past and present.

Air bases

Active

Reserve

Closed

Airfields

Active

Closed

External links
Official site of the Romanian Air Force
Order of Battle of the Romanian Air Force

Romanian Air Force bases